The Zhudong Animation and Comic Creative Park is a theme park in Zhudong Township, Hsinchu County, Taiwan.

History
The park was opened for trial basis on 18 December 2015 on its western part in a ceremony attended by Hsinchu County Magistrate Chiu Ching-chun. Its eastern part was opened in 2016.

Architecture
The park was designed by a team from Joy Magical Co., Ltd. It consists of five main halls, which are Master Pavilion, Multimedia Pavilion, Creative Store, Mushroom House and Performance Hall.

Transportation
The park is accessible from Zhudong Station of Taiwan Railways.

See also
 List of tourist attractions in Taiwan

References

2015 establishments in Taiwan
Amusement parks in Hsinchu County
Amusement parks opened in 2015